Earlsdon is a residential suburb and electoral ward of Coventry, England. It lies approximately one mile to the southwest of Coventry City Centre. It is the birthplace of aviation pioneer Frank Whittle.

Amenities
Most shops and restaurants are laid out on Earlsdon Street, the suburban high street.  Earlsdon Library is one of the largest of the local-authority libraries outside of the city centre.

In major sports, Earlsdon has its own rugby, golf and tennis clubs. Recreation grounds for football also are in Earlsdon.

History

In the mid-19th century, Earlsdon was a hub of activity for the rising watch-making trade. Even as the industry began to decline, Earlsdon continued to grow and was incorporated into the city of Coventry in 1890. The watch-making trade is represented by the clock on the roundabout at the bottom of the high street, where Earlsdon Avenue North and South join.

In 1897, the opening of Albany Road, named after Princess Helena, Duchess of Albany, who visited Coventry in November the following year, allowed for far greater access to and from the rest of the city and development in Earlsdon quickly increased. By 1918, the area was fully developed as it is today, but has seen some redevelopment in recent years.

Today, Earlsdon is a large residential suburb associated with Wainsbody ward to the south. Many academics and students from Coventry University and the University of Warwick live in both wards as they are closest to Coventry University and have streets of upmarket Edwardian homes for industry owners and, increasingly, on the expansion of higher education centres, researchers and lecturers.

In August 2006 following a torrential downpour of rain, the main street of Earlsdon suffered from serious flooding. Many businesses were affected, and some were forced to close for a time.

Places of interest

The hub of Earlsdon is what is locally referred to as the "Earlsdon High Street", in reality Earlsdon Street. This is a strip of commercial units that includes a number of restaurants and pubs. The area surrounding Earlsdon Street consists of rows of terraced houses and a few small shops. In the south of the locality is the large civic landscaped War Memorial Park, the north abuts Hearsall Common, and Canley Ford abuts the west.

Frank Whittle

Sir Frank Whittle (1907–96), the jet engine pioneer, was born in Earlsdon in a terraced house on Newcombe Road, which is marked out by a small grey commemorative plaque. He attended a school in Earlsdon, and he was inspired to pursue a career in engineering after allegedly seeing an aircraft land on Hearsall Common. At the age of nine he moved to Leamington Spa with his family when his father started an engineering factory there.

Arts and culture
Earlsdon has its own theatre, the Criterion Theatre, that puts on six main house performances a year, as well as numerous visiting companies and workshop productions.  ECHO (Earlsdon, Chapelfields Hearsall Opinion) is the longest running independent community newspaper in the country (http://www.echonews.org.uk). There is an annual "Earlsdon Festival", that takes place in Earlsdon Street and other locations nearby during the May Day bank holiday. The annual Godiva Festival takes place within the War Memorial Park usually during one week-end in July.

Demography

Politics
Earlsdon has long covered Canley Gardens but also covers Styvechale as well as the westernmost mainstay marked as Earlsdon on most maps.

As of December 2009 the ward is represented by 3 local councillors who sit on Coventry City Council: Allan Andrews (C), Becky Gittins (Lab) and Kindy Sandhu (Lab).

Parts of Earlsdon also fall under Whoberley Ward and St Michael's Ward.

Gallery

See also
St Barbara's Church, Earlsdon

References

Suburbs of Coventry